Ash Creek is a short stream in Polk County, in the U.S. state of Oregon. Formed by the merger of its north and middle forks near Monmouth, it flows generally east to meet the Willamette River at Independence. The creek passes under Oregon Route 51 just before entering the river.

Middle Fork Ash Creek begins at  near Mount Pisgah and flows generally east. Both forks pass under Oregon Route 99W shortly before they merge to form the main stem.

Ash Creek is joined by a third fork, South Fork Ash Creek, in Independence. The South Fork begins at  slightly south of the Middle Fork and flows generally east to meet the main stem at  The South Fork passes under Route 99W south of Monmouth and under Route 51 in Independence.

None of the three forks has a named tributary. Before alterations by settlers in the 19th century, the basin was a "boggy, 'braided' marsh with many small creeks spilling into Ash Creek" and the river. European-Americans drained and leveled wetlands and riparian zones for farming, logging, housing, and urban development.

See also
List of rivers of Oregon

References

External links
Luckiamute Watershed Council

Tributaries of the Willamette River
Rivers of Oregon
Rivers of Polk County, Oregon